Teodoro Noel Martínez Encarnación (born December 10, 1947, in Santa Cruz de Barahona, Dominican Republic) is a former professional baseball infielder. He played all or part of nine seasons in Major League Baseball, mostly as a shortstop and second baseman, for the New York Mets (1970–74), St. Louis Cardinals (1975), Oakland Athletics (1975) and Los Angeles Dodgers (1977–79).

Career
He helped the Mets win the 1973 National League pennant, the Athletics win the 1975 American League West and the Dodgers win the 1977 and 1978 National League pennant.

In 9 seasons he played in 657 games and had 1,480 at bats, 165 runs, 355 hits, 50 doubles, 16 triples, 7 home runs, 108 RBI, 29 stolen Bases, 55 walks (12 intentional), .240 batting average, .270 on-base percentage, .309 slugging percentage, 458 total bases, 25 sacrifice hits and 6 sacrifice flies. Defensively, he finished with an overall .968 fielding percentage.

Sources

1947 births
Albuquerque Dukes players
Alacranes de Campeche players
Dominican Republic expatriate baseball players in Mexico
Dominican Republic expatriate baseball players in the United States
Florida Instructional League Mets players
Indianapolis Indians players

Living people
Los Angeles Dodgers players
Major League Baseball second basemen
Major League Baseball shortstops
Major League Baseball players from the Dominican Republic
Marion Mets players
Memphis Blues players
Mexican League baseball players
New York Mets players
Oakland Athletics players
People from Barahona Province
Plataneros de Tabasco players
Raleigh-Durham Mets players
St. Louis Cardinals players
Tidewater Tides players
Visalia Mets players
Winter Haven Mets players